Edisa is a settlement in the Java district of Georgia.

See also
 Shida Kartli

References 

Populated places in Shida Kartli